Stephanie Antoinette Franziska Stebich (born January 26, 1966 in Mülheim) is a German-born American art historian and curator. Stebich is currently the Margaret and Terry Stent Director of the Smithsonian American Art Museum.

Career
Born in Germany to Gehard and Ute, Stebich's family immigrated to Scarsdale, New York, when she was three years old. She graduated from Phillips Exeter Academy in 1984. Stebich then continued on to receive degrees in art history: a Bachelor of Arts from Columbia University in 1988 and a Master of Arts from New York University Institute of Fine Arts.

Stebich began her career in museum directorship in Assistant Director positions: the Brooklyn Museum from 1992 to 1995, the Cleveland Museum of Art from 1995 to 2001, and the Minneapolis Institute of Art from 2001 to 2004. In the following year, she became Executive Director of the Tacoma Art Museum. In 2017, Stebich was named the Margaret and Terry Stent Director of the Smithsonian American Art Museum, succeeding Elizabeth Broun. A year later, Stebich was selected as co-chair of the museum's American Women's History Initiative, along with Provost John Davis.

Personal life
On August 14, 2016, Stebich married fellow art historian and museum director Anne-Imelda Radice.

See also
List of Columbia College people
List of female art museum directors
List of gay, lesbian or bisexual people: Sj–Sz
List of New York University alumni
List of Phillips Exeter Academy people
List of people from Scarsdale, New York

References

External links
Smithsonian profile

1966 births
Living people
People from Mülheim
People from Scarsdale, New York
German emigrants to the United States
21st-century American women
American art historians
Women art historians
Women museum directors
American LGBT people
Phillips Exeter Academy alumni
Columbia College (New York) alumni
New York University Institute of Fine Arts alumni
Brooklyn Museum
Smithsonian Institution people